Schizomeridaceae is a family of algae in the order Chaetophorales.

References

External links

Chlorophyceae families
Monogeneric algae families
Chaetophorales